The Chinese Ambassador to Eritrea is the official representative of the People's Republic of China to Eritrea.

List of representatives

See also
China–Eritrea relations

References 

Ambassadors of China
Ambassadors to Eritrea
Eritrea
China